Oosteinde is a village in the municipality of Het Hogeland, Groningen, the Netherlands. It is located southeast of Roodeschool, near the river Groote Tjariet. It had a population of around 160 in January 2017.

History
The village was first mentioned between 1851 and 1855 as Oosteinde, and means "eastern end". The  River is located to the east of the village.

In 1846, a church was built in Oosteinde which was also intended for the nearby village of Oudeschip. It was part of Uithuizermeeden municipality before 1979, when it became part of Hefshuizen. In 2019, it became part of the municipality of Het Hogeland.

Gallery

References

External links 

Het Hogeland
Populated places in Groningen (province)